The year 2021 is the 50th year after the independence of Bangladesh. It is also the third year of the fourth term of the government of Sheikh Hasina. This year the entire country celebrated the 50th anniversary of independence.

Incumbents

Events

January and February 
14 January - A fire at the Nayapara refugee camp for Rohingya refugees in Cox’s Bazar District burned down, destroying approximately 550 shelters.
25-28 February - Protests across the country following the death of journalist Mushtaq Ahmed in police custody.

March and April 
19-29 March - Protests erupt across Bangladesh as Indian Prime Minister Narendra Modi visits the country.
22 March - At least 15 people are dead and at least 400 are missing after a massive fire strikes Cox Bazar's Rohingya Refugee camp
4 April - Rescuers recover 26 bodies after a ferry collides with a cargo vessel in Shitalakhsya River near the capital Dhaka.
17 April - While workers in a coal power plant in Chittagong were holding protesting over their unpaid wage, the police stormed on them and opened fire, 5 workers killed, 15 injured in the police firing.

May and June 
9 June - A large fire destroys over 500 homes in a slum in Mohakhali.
27 June - Seven people were killed and more than a hundred were injured after an explosion in Dhaka.

July and August 
8 July - At least 52 people were killed by a fire at a food and drink factory in Rupganj.
9 August - Bangladesh wins the 5 matches T20I cricket series against Australia 4-1, in the final match Australia lost while registering their lowest ever T20I score of 62.

September and October 
29 September - Murder of Mohibullah
Communal violence rocked the country during and after the Durga Puja festival, from October 13 to October 22. The Government took necessary measures to ensure the arrest of those responsible for the violence.

November and December 
12 November - Political violence between rival political factions during the 2021 Union Parishad elections resulted in the death of 7 people.
 6 December: Cyclone Jawad caused heavy rain in the region.
16 December: Bangladesh celebrates 50 years of Victory in the 1971 Bangladesh War of Independence.
24 December: A fire on a ferry kills about 40 people.

Awards and recognitions

International recognition
 In August, the Ramon Magsaysay Award was presented to Firdausi Qadri, a Bangladeshi scientist with specialization in immunology and infectious disease research, working as a director for Centre for Vaccine Sciences of International Centre for Diarrhoeal Disease and Research, Bangladesh (icddr,b).

Independence Day Award
Total 9 persons and 1 organisation were awarded.

Ekushey Padak
It was awarded to 21 persons.
 Motahar Hossain Talukdar, language movement (posthumous)
 Md. Shamsul Haque, language movement (posthumous)
 Afsar Uddin Ahmed, language movement (posthumous)
 Papia Sarwar, music
 Raisul Islam Asad, performing arts
 Salma Begum Sujata, performing arts
 Ahmed Iqbal Haider, drama
 Syed Salahuddin Zaki, film
 Bhaskar Bandopandhay, recitation 
 Pavel Rahman, photography 
 Golam Hasnayen, Liberation War
 Fazlur Rahman Faruque, Liberation War
 Syeda Issabela, Liberation War (posthumous) 
 Ajoy Dasgupta, journalism  
 Samir Kumar Saha, research
 Mahfuza Khanam, education
 Mirza Abdul Jalil, economics 
 Kazi Kamruzzaman, social service
 Quazi Rosy,  language and literature
 Bulbul Chowdhury, language and literature 
 Ghulam Murshid, language and literature

Deaths
3 January — Rabeya Khatun, novelist (b. 1935).
20 February — ATM Shamsuzzaman, actor (b. 1941).
16 March — Moudud Ahmed, politician (b. 1940).
7 April — Indra Mohan Rajbongshi, singer (b. 1946).
11 April — Mita Haque, singer (b. 1962).
14 April — Abdul Matin Khasru, politician (b. 1950).
17 April — Kabori Sarwar, film actress and politician (b. 1950).
18 April — Mesbahuddin Ahmed a.k.a. Wasim, film actor (b. 1947).
22 June — Mohiuddin Ahmed, publisher and founder of The University Press Limited (b.1944)
23 July — Fakir Alamgir, singer (b. 1950).
31 August — Bashir Al Helal, novelist (b. 1936).
24 September — Ustad Julhas Uddin Ahmed, singer (b. 1933).
11 October — Enamul Haque, actor (b. 1943).
15 November — Hasan Azizul Huq, novelist (b. 1939).

References

 
2020s in Bangladesh